Tondiarpet Metro station (formerly Korukkupet Metro Station) is a metro railway station on Line 1 Extension of the Chennai Metro. It is one of the 26 stations on the Blue Line (Chennai Metro). The station serves the neighbourhoods of Tondiarpet and other northern suburbs of Chennai.

Station layout

History
The station was opened on 14 February 2021 with the opening of the northern extension of Blue line of Phase I.

See also
 List of Chennai metro stations
 Railway stations in Chennai

References

External links

 
 UrbanRail.Net – descriptions of all metro systems in the world, each with a schematic map showing all stations.

Chennai Metro stations
Railway stations in Chennai